Kristian Poulsen (born 18 November 1975) is a Danish auto racing driver, who currently competes in touring car racing.

Career
He made his debut in the FIA World Touring Car Championship in 2008 with a part season. For 2009 he will compete a full season in the WTCC with Liqui Moly Team Engstler in a BMW 320si alongside team owner, Franz Engstler. He has previously raced in karting and rallying in the World Rally Championship from 1995. He switched to touring cars in 2007, when he competed in his native Danish Touringcar Championship. He won the LMP2 class at the 2009 24 Hours of Le Mans in the Team Essex Porsche RS Spyder alongside Emmanuel Collard and Casper Elgaard. Kristian currently drives the BMW 320si for Liqui Moly Team Engstler alongside Franz Engstler in the World Touring Car Championship.

Racing record

Complete World Touring Car Championship results
(key) (Races in bold indicate pole position) (Races in italics indicate fastest lap)

24 Hours of Le Mans results

1 Simonsen was killed in a Lap 3 crash.  Neither Nygaard nor Poulsen had driven at the time.

References

External links

1975 births
Living people
Danish racing drivers
Danish Touring Car Championship drivers
World Touring Car Championship drivers
24 Hours of Le Mans drivers
European Le Mans Series drivers
FIA World Endurance Championship drivers
ADAC GT Masters drivers
European Touring Car Cup drivers
Danish expatriate sportspeople in Germany
Aston Martin Racing drivers
Larbre Compétition drivers
24H Series drivers
Le Mans Cup drivers
Engstler Motorsport drivers